The Bertha Benz Memorial Route is a German tourist and theme route in  Baden-Württemberg and member of the European Route of Industrial Heritage. It opened in 2008 and follows the tracks of the world's first long distance road trip by a vehicle powered with an internal combustion engine, in 1888.

History

Bertha Benz's husband, Karl Benz, patented the first automobile designed to produce its own power in January 1886 (Reichspatent No. 37435).

In early August 1888, without her husband's knowledge, Bertha Benz, with her sons Richard (aged 14) and Eugen (aged 15), drove in Benz's newly constructed Patent Motorwagen No. 3 automobile, from Mannheim to her own birthplace, Pforzheim, becoming the first person to drive an automobile powered with an internal combustion engine over more than a very short distance. Distances driven before this historic trip were short, being merely trials with mechanical assistants.

Although the ostensible purpose of the trip was to visit her mother, Bertha Benz also had another motive: to show her husband – who had failed to consider marketing his invention adequately – that the automobile would become a financial success once it was shown to be useful to the general public.

On the way, she solved numerous problems. She had to find Ligroin, a solvent available only at dispensing chemists' shops, to use as fuel. Thus the still existing Stadt-Apotheke (Town Pharmacy) in Wiesloch, some kilometres south of Heidelberg, became the world's first filling station. A blacksmith had to help mend a chain in Bruchsal. Brake linings were replaced in Bauschlott/Neulingen north of Pforzheim. And Bertha Benz had to use a long, straight hatpin to clean a fuel pipe which had become blocked, and a garter to insulate a wire.

Bertha and her sons left Mannheim around dawn and reached Pforzheim somewhat after dusk, notifying Karl of their successful journey by telegram. They drove back to Mannheim three days later, by a different route.

Along the way, several people were frightened by the automobile and the novel trip received a great deal of publicity – as she had intended. The drive was very helpful for Karl Benz, as he was able to introduce several improvements after his wife reported everything that had happened along the way – and she made important suggestions, such as the introduction of an additional gear for climbing hills.

Overview
In 2007 a not-for-profit initiative, led by Edgar and Frauke Meyer, founded two societies, Bertha Benz Memorial Route e.V. and Bertha Benz Memorial Club e.V., to commemorate Bertha Benz and her historic pioneering deed.

On February 25, 2008, the Bertha Benz Memorial Route was officially approved as a Tourist or Scenic Route by the German authorities, a dynamic monument of 194 km of German industrial culture.

The route

Outbound trip

Mannheim to Pforzheim, approx. , southbound (S):

GPS-Download

Mannheim, Mannheim-Feudenheim, Ilvesheim, Ladenburg, Schriesheim, Dossenheim, Heidelberg, Leimen, Nußloch, Wiesloch, Mingolsheim, Langenbrücken, Stettfeld, Ubstadt, Bruchsal, Untergrombach, Weingarten, Karlsruhe-Grötzingen, Berghausen, Söllingen, Kleinsteinbach, Wilferdingen, Königsbach, Stein, Eisingen, Pforzheim

Return trip
Pforzheim to Mannheim, approx. , northbound (N):

GPS-Download

Pforzheim, Bauschlott, Bretten, Gondelsheim, Helmsheim, Heidelsheim, Bruchsal, Forst, Hambrücken, Wiesental, Kirrlach, Reilingen, Hockenheim, Talhaus, Ketsch, Schwetzingen, Mannheim-Friedrichsfeld, Mannheim-Seckenheim, Mannheim

Landscapes
The authentic route taken by Bertha Benz not only links almost forgotten original sites she passed on her way, it also leads to one of the most attractive scenic regions in Germany, the wine region of Baden.

The route follows several Roman roads in the area of the Upper Rhine Plain, for example the Bergstraße (Mountain Road), it leads along the foot of the Odenwald mountains and the Kraichgau, and shortly before reaching Karlsruhe it branches off into the Pfinz valley leading to Pforzheim, the entrance to the Black Forest.

As Bertha was afraid of some steep mountains, the return trip follows an alternative route and finishes by following the Rhine river back to Mannheim.

Sights
 Mannheim: Mannheim Palace, Luisenpark, Water-Tower
 Ladenburg: Automuseum Dr. Carl Benz, House of the Benz Family, Old Town
 Heidelberg: Heidelberg Castle, Old Town, Old Bridge
 Wiesloch: The World's first filling station (Town Pharmacy)
 Bruchsal: Bruchsal Castle
 Pforzheim: Museum of Jewelry, House of Industry
 Bretten: Melanchthon's House, close by Maulbronn Abbey (World Heritage Site of  UNESCO), students: Johannes Kepler, Friedrich Hölderlin, Hermann Hesse (Steppenwolf)
 Hockenheim: Museum of Motorsports at the Hockenheimring, Hockenheimring
 Schwetzingen: Schwetzingen Castle

Bertha Benz Challenge
The Bertha Benz Memorial Route opened in September 2008. But the Ministry of State of Baden-Wuerttemberg suggested embedding the official inaugural run in the framework of the ceremony of Automobile Summer 2011, the big official German event and birthday party commemorating the invention of the automobile by Karl Benz.

On January 25, 2011 Deutsche Welle (DW-TV) broadcast worldwide in its series Made in Germany a TV documentary on the invention of the automobile by Karl Benz, highlighting the very important role of his wife Bertha Benz.  The report was not only on the history of the automobile, but took a look at its future as well, as shown by the Bertha Benz Challenge.

The first Bertha Benz Challenge took place on September 10 and 11, 2011. In the future it will take place yearly, aiming to become a globally visible signal for a new automobile breakthrough, as it is only open for sustainable mobility: Future-oriented vehicles with alternative drive systems – hybrid and electric vehicles, hydrogen and fuel cells – and other extremely economical vehicles.

Its motto is: Sustainable Mobility on the World's Oldest Automobile Road!

The second Bertha Benz Challenge took place from September 14 to 16, 2012, but started from the Automechanika held by the Frankfurt Trade Fair. It also included two rounds on the motodrom of the Hockenheimring, that thus opened itself towards sustainable future mobility.

The third Bertha Benz Challenge took place from September 13 to 15, 2013, starting for the first time from the Frankfurt Motor Show, one of the world's largest motor shows, and supported by the presence of the German Environment Minister, Peter Altmaier along with Winfried Kretschmann and Volker Bouffier, the Prime Ministers respectively of Baden-Württemberg and Hesse.

References

Notes

Bibliography

 (Karl Volk:) Carl Benz. Lebensfahrt eines Erfinders. Koehler & Amelang 1925, unchanged reprint München 2001, . ( Onlineversion)
 Angela Elis: Mein Traum ist länger als die Nacht. Wie Bertha Benz ihren Mann zu Weltruhm fuhr. Hoffmann und Campe, Hamburg 2010, .
 Hans-Erhard Lessing u.a. (Hg): Die Benzwagen. Reprint of the company's publication of 1913. Wellhöfer-Verlag, Mannheim 2008
 Hans-Erhard Lessing: Mannheimer Pioniere. Wellhöfer-Verlag, Mannheim 2007
 Winfried A. Seidel: Carl Benz. Eine badische Geschichte. Edition Diesbach, Weinheim 2005, .

External links

Bertha Benz Memorial Route
Prof. John H. Lienhard on Bertha Benz's ride
Automuseum Dr. Carl Benz, Ladenburg
List of sights along the Bertha Benz Memorial Route

Monuments and memorials in Germany
Tourist attractions in Baden-Württemberg
German tourist routes
Transport in Baden-Württemberg
2008 establishments in Germany
History of transport in Germany